The China Quarterly (CQ) is a British double-blind peer-reviewed academic journal established in 1960 on contemporary China including Taiwan.

It is considered the most important research journal about China in the world and is published by the Cambridge University Press.  It covers anthropology, business, literature, the arts, economics, geography, history, international affairs, law, politics, and sociology. Each issue contains articles and research reports, and a book review section. The China Quarterly is owned by the School of Oriental and African Studies, University of London. Its editor-in-chief is Tim Pringle.

History
The China Quarterly began as an offshoot of Soviet Survey, a journal published by the Congress for Cultural Freedom (CCF). In 1959, Walter Laqueur, the editor of Soviet Survey, asked sinologist Roderick MacFarquhar to edit the new journal, the first issue of which was released in 1960. The publisher was transferred in 1968 from the CCF to the Contemporary China Institute at the School of Oriental and African Studies at the University of London.

The transfer followed the revelation that the CCF was funded by the Central Intelligence Agency through the Farfield Foundation. MacFarquhar said he did not know about the relationship and his editorship was not influenced by the CCF. However, he admitted to knowingly publishing articles provided by the CIA and the British Foreign Office's covert propaganda unit, the Information Research Department, and giving the authors pseudonyms to keep their identities secret. David Wilson succeeded MacFarquhar as editor in 1968.

Controversies 

In August 2017, Cambridge University Press (CUP), the publisher, confirmed it had removed access to more than 300 articles from readers in China following pressure from Chinese government. Cambridge University Press subsequently reversed its decision and restored the articles. Cambridge University Press stated they blocked this material in China to avoid having their entire publication blocked. The press published a list of the articles removed which included sensitive topics such as human rights abuses in Xinjiang and Tibet, the 1989 Tiananmen Square protests and massacre, pro-democracy movements in Hong Kong and the negative effects of the Cultural Revolution. Several academics criticised the decision of Cambridge University Press to self-censor, however CUP stated that it was "troubled by the recent increase in requests of this nature" and was committed to academic freedom.

The Guardian reported the censorship was part of a broader crack-down on dissent since Xi Jinping became the General Secretary of the Chinese Communist Party in 2012.

Abstracting and indexing
This journal is indexed by the following services:

 Social Sciences Citation Index
 Current Contents/Social & Behavioral Sciences
 International Bibliography of Periodical Literature
 International Bibliography of Book Reviews of Scholarly Literature

References

External links 

Chinese studies journals
Publications established in 1960
Quarterly journals
English-language journals
Cambridge University Press academic journals
Information Research Department
SOAS University of London
Congress for Cultural Freedom
CIA activities in Russia and Europe
Cold War propaganda